"Brother Down" is the debut single by Canadian musician Sam Roberts. It was first featured on Roberts' demo recording Brother Down, and selected for his 2002 EP The Inhuman Condition. The song reached No. 3 on Canada's Nielsen rock airplay chart. It was one of the top 30 most played songs on radio in Canada in 2002. The song was later re-recorded for his debut album, We Were Born in a Flame. It was released as a single in the US in 2004.

The song was also featured in the animated MTV sitcom Undergrads as well as the 2003 action film S.W.A.T., more so on the film's soundtrack.

Between 1995 and 2016, "Brother Down" was the third most played song by a Canadian artist on rock radio stations in Canada.

Awards and nominations
2003 - nominated for Single of the Year at the 2003 Juno Awards.
2003 - won Best VideoFACT at the MuchMusic Video Awards.
2003 - nominated for Best Pop Video and Best Independent Video at the MuchMusic Video Awards.

References

External links

2002 songs
2002 debut singles
Sam Roberts songs
Songs written by Sam Roberts